De Graff is a city in Swift County, Minnesota, United States. The population was 115 at the 2010 census.

History
De Graff was laid out in 1875, and named for Andrew De Graff, a railroad agent. A post office was established at De Graff in 1873, and remained in operation until 1996. De Graff was incorporated in 1881.

Geography

U.S. Route 12 serves as a main route in the community.

Demographics

2010 census
As of the census of 2010, there were 115 people, 53 households, and 34 families residing in the city. The racial makeup of the city was 94.8% White, 4.3% African American, and 0.9% from two or more races.

There were 53 households, of which 26.4% had children under the age of 18 living with them, 54.7% were married couples living together, 5.7% had a female householder with no husband present, 3.8% had a male householder with no wife present, and 35.8% were non-families. 34.0% of all households were made up of individuals, and 17% had someone living alone who was 65 years of age or older. The average household size was 2.17 and the average family size was 2.71.

The median age in the city was 45.3 years. 15.7% of residents were under the age of 18; 10.4% were between the ages of 18 and 24; 23.4% were from 25 to 44; 40.1% were from 45 to 64; and 10.4% were 65 years of age or older. The gender makeup of the city was 53.9% male and 46.1% female.

2000 census
As of the census of 2000, there were 133 people, 60 households, and 31 families residing in the city. The racial makeup of the city was 99.25% White, and 0.75% from two or more races. Hispanic or Latino of any race were 2.26% of the population.

There were 60 households, out of which 28.3% had children under the age of 18 living with them, 43.3% were married couples living together, 5.0% had a female householder with no husband present, and 46.7% were non-families. 43.3% of all households were made up of individuals, and 21.7% had someone living alone who was 65 years of age or older. The average household size was 2.22 and the average family size was 3.13.

In the city, the population was spread out, with 29.3% under the age of 18, 5.3% from 18 to 24, 30.1% from 25 to 44, 21.1% from 45 to 64, and 14.3% who were 65 years of age or older. The median age was 36 years. For every 100 females, there were 107.8 males. For every 100 females age 18 and over, there were 108.9 males.

The median income for a household in the city was $38,000, and the median income for a family was $40,625. Males had a median income of $29,286 versus $22,813 for females. The per capita income for the city was $14,987. There were 9.8% of families and 9.7% of the population living below the poverty line, including 3.4% of under eighteens and 18.2% of those over 64.

References

Cities in Minnesota
Cities in Swift County, Minnesota